Kinbawn is a historic home located in West Whiteland Township, Chester County, Pennsylvania. The house was built in 1888.  It is a -story, frame dwelling on a stone foundation in the Queen Anne / Shingle Style.  It has a steeply pitched hipped roof and eyebrow windows.  Also on the property is a contributing stable.  The house was built as part of a development known as Bradford Hills.

It was listed on the National Register of Historic Places in 1984.

References

Houses on the National Register of Historic Places in Pennsylvania
Queen Anne architecture in Pennsylvania
Shingle Style architecture in Pennsylvania
Houses completed in 1888
Houses in Chester County, Pennsylvania
National Register of Historic Places in Chester County, Pennsylvania